Kinesin family member 13B is a protein that in humans is encoded by the KIF13B gene.

References

Further reading

External links 
 PDBe-KB provides an overview of all the structure information available in the PDB for Human Kinesin-like protein KIF13B